Gabriele Krone-Schmalz (born 8 November 1949 in Lam, District of Cham, Bavaria) is a German broadcast journalist and author.

Biography 
With an academic background in Eastern European history, political science, and Slavic studies, Krone-Schmalz holds a doctorate in history and political science. Since 1976, she has worked primarily for various radio and television broadcasts of the West German broadcasting company Westdeutscher Rundfunk.
   
Krone-Schmalz worked at the Moscow studio of ARD broadcasting from 1987 to 1992. Between 1992 and 1997, she hosted the world culture programming of the ARD. Since then, she has been self-employed as a freelance journalist.

Krone-Schmalz is also known for her involvement with the philanthropic work on behalf of orphans in Saint Petersburg. She is the author of several books on Russia.

In 2008 she was awarded with the prestigious Pushkin Medal of the Russian Federation.

She is sometimes described as Putinversteher and as a "mouthpiece of Putin's propaganda".

Books 
 1993: Russland wird nicht untergehen... (Russia Will Not Stand Down), ECON Verlag, 
 2000: An Russland muss man einfach glauben. Meine Moskauer Jahre. (You Simply Must Believe in Russia. My Years in Moscow), ECON-Verlag, 
 2007: Was passiert in Russland (What Is Happening in Russia), Herbig-Verlag, 1. Auflage, 29. September 2007, 
 2015: Russland verstehen: Der Kampf um die Ukraine und die Arroganz des Westens (Understanding Russia: The Battle for Ukraine and the Arrogance of the West),

Career recognition 
 1987 Adolf-Grimme-Preis, Live special award in silver for Drei vor Mitternacht" (Three before midnight, German)
 1989 German Critics' Prize for Kraftakte – Frauenalltag in der Sowjetunion (Women's Everyday Life in the Soviet Union, ARD film)
 1990 Golden Gong for KGB-Verbrechen und Glasnost'' (KGB Crimes and Glasnost, ARD film) 
 1997 Hildegard von Bingen Prize for Journalism
 1997 Waldschmidt Prize of the Bavarian Forest Association
 1997 Order of Merit of the Federal Republic of Germany, 1st class
 2008 Pushkin Medal

References

External links 
 
 

1949 births
Living people
People from Cham (district)
German women journalists
German women writers
Officers Crosses of the Order of Merit of the Federal Republic of Germany
Recipients of the Medal of Pushkin
German reporters and correspondents
20th-century German journalists
21st-century German journalists
ARD (broadcaster) people
Westdeutscher Rundfunk people
20th-century German women
21st-century German women